Apolloni is an Italian surname. Notable people with the surname include:

Achille Apolloni (1823–1901), Italian cardinal 
Adolfo Apolloni (1855–1923), Italian sculptor
Ag Apolloni (born 1982), Albanian writer, poet, playwright, scholar and essayist
Giovanni Filippo Apolloni (c. 1620 – 1688), Italian composer and librettist
Giuseppe Apolloni (1822–1889), Italian composer
Luigi Apolloni (born 1967), Italian football manager and former player

See also
Apollonis, a Muse in Greek mythology

Italian-language surnames